Mayor of Dartmouth may refer to:

 List of mayors of Dartmouth, Nova Scotia
Mayor of Dartmouth, Devon